The 194th Pennsylvania House of Representatives District is located in Montgomery County and Philadelphia County and includes the following areas:

 Montgomery County
 Lower Merion Township (PART) 
 Ward 03
 Ward 09
 Ward 13 [PART, Division 03]
 Philadelphia (PART)
 Ward 21
 Ward 38 [PART, Divisions 01, 07, 08, 12, 13, 14, 15, 16, 19 and 20]

Representatives

References

Government of Montgomery County, Pennsylvania
Government of Philadelphia
194